Hans Ludwig Raimund von Koester (29 April 1844 – 21 February 1928) was a German naval officer who served in the Prussian Navy and later in the Imperial German Navy. He retired as a Grand Admiral.

Career overview
Born Hans Ludwig Raimund Koester in 1844 in Schwerin, Mecklenburg-Schwerin, he entered the Prussian Navy as a Kadettenanwärter (Cadet candidate) on 21 June 1859. He had an active seagoing career in the service, which became the North German Federal Navy in 1866, and then the Imperial German Navy in 1871. His first command was the naval brig Undine which he took on a 15-month voyage to North, Central, and South America in 1874–75.

Promoted to Korvettenkapitän (Lieutenant-Commander) in 1875, he was later assigned to various training ships, the latest of which was the Kreuzerfregatte (cruiser-frigate) Prinz Adalbert, which he took on a world cruise from 1878 to 1880. Koester was promoted to Kapitän zur See in 1881. Appointed commander of the Segelfregatte (sail frigate)  in 1883, Koester next took command of the Panzerkorvette (armored corvette - later battleship)  in 1884. In 1887 he was named commander of the Panzerfregatte (armored frigate - later armored cruiser) , long the largest ship in the fleet.

From 1884 to 1887 he served 2.5 years as chief of staff of the German Imperial Admiralty (Kaiserliche Admiralität), then headed by Admiral und General der Infanterie Leo von Caprivi. In 1887 he became another 2.5 years as director of the Kaiserliche Werft (Imperial Dockyard) at Kiel. Then, until 1903 he occupied the post as commander of the Baltic Sea Naval Station in Kiel. In this capacity he strongly encouraged development of Kiel as a naval harbor and garrison town.

When Admiral Alfred von Tirpitz presented his plan for a great battle fleet in June 1897, Koester objected on the grounds that there simply were not the personnel to cover such an expansion of the navy, and that the resources would be much better spent elsewhere.

He was promoted to Konteradmiral (rear admiral or commodore) in 1889, Vizeadmiral in 1892, and full admiral in 1897. It was he, as acting commander in chief in place of a sick Admiral Eduard von Knorr, who sent the German East Asia Squadron commanded by Otto von Diederichs to the Shandong Peninsula area in the fall of 1897, and who gave the order to take over Kiautschou in November. He was named to the somewhat ceremonial post of Generalinspekteur der Marine (Inspector General of the Navy) in 1899, but retained his post as Commander of the Kiel Naval Station until 1903. In 1900, he was instrumental in uncovering the poor preparation and staffing of the German Imperial Admiralty Staff under Diederichs, which "was a threat to national security."  However, along with Vice Admiral August von Thomsen (Commander of the First Naval Division in Wilhelmshaven), he strongly opposed the solution Diederichs proposed: a major increase in the size of the Admiralty Staff, the creation of a separate intelligence section, and the removal of the Naval War College (Marineacademie) to Berlin. In the meantime, he was raised to the German nobility in 1900 as Hans von Koester.

On 18 September 1902 he was decorated with the Order of the Black Eagle. Koester was awarded the 'Diamonds' distinction of this order on 21 June 1909.

Koester became the first active-duty German naval officer to attain the rank of Grossadmiral (Grand Admiral) on 28 June 1905; the previous recipients of this rank were Kaiser Wilhelm II of Germany and King Oscar II of Sweden (both in 1901). Named a member for life of the Prussian House of Lords (Herrenhaus) on 17 September 1905, Koester was retired at his own request on 31 December 1906.

Elected president of the Deutsche Flottenverein (German Fleet Association) in 1908, he held this position until October 1919; thereafter he was honorary president. In this position he worked closely with Admiral Alfred von Tirpitz to raise public support for the navy by promoting "public theater" with navy related activities such as ship launches, which became extremely elaborate after 1900. He represented Germany at the Hudson–Fulton Celebration in New York, 25 September-11 October 1909. Made an honorary citizen of Kiel on his 70th birthday, 29 April 1914, Koester worked during the First World War as a delegate of the Kaiserliche Marine for health care. In 1916-17 he was an advocate of unrestricted submarine warfare.

Koester died in Kiel in 1928 at the age of 83. He was buried in the Nordfriedhof cemetery.

Decorations and awards
He received the following orders and decorations:
National

Foreign

Notes
 "Germany Sends Von Koester", The New York Times, 23 July 1909.
 James W. Gerard, My Four Years in Germany, p. 108 New York: George H. Doran Company, 1917.

References

Sources

 Jürgen Hahn-Butry (Hrsg.): Preußisch-deutsche Feldmarschälle und Großadmirale. Safari, Berlin 1938.

External links
 

(Saxony)
(Norway)

1844 births
1928 deaths
People from Schwerin
People from the Grand Duchy of Mecklenburg-Schwerin
Imperial German Navy admirals of World War I
Grand admirals of the Imperial German Navy
Members of the Prussian House of Lords
Honorary Knights Grand Cross of the Royal Victorian Order
Grand Crosses of the Military Merit Order (Bavaria)
Recipients of the Royal Order of Kalākaua
Recipients of the Order of the Rising Sun, 3rd class
Grand Officers of the Order of Saints Maurice and Lazarus
Grand Crosses of the Order of Saint-Charles
Recipients of the Order of St. Anna, 1st class
Commanders Grand Cross of the Order of the Sword
Recipients of the Order of the Netherlands Lion
Grand Crosses of Military Merit